Bees Bagla is a village in Bagh District, Azad Kashmir, Pakistan. It is 20 kilometres from the district capital, Bagh, and 4 kilometres from the next village, Mallot. The village was extensively damaged during the 2005 Kashmir earthquake; international aid supported the rebuilding of a school in the village.

References

Bagh District